Cheddar's Scratch Kitchen, formerly known as Cheddar's Casual Cafe, is an American restaurant chain based in Irving, Texas. Founded in 1979, the company has more than 170 locations in 28 states as of 2018.

History
Cheddar's was founded in 1979 by Aubrey Good and Doug Rogers. The first location was in Arlington, Texas, and the chain reached 10 locations by 1995.

By 2003, Cheddar's generated $150 million in revenue from 42 restaurants in 13 states and Brazos Private Equity Partners made an initial investment to grow the company that year.  In August 2006, when the company generated $245 million in revenue from 55 restaurants in 15 states, Oak Investment Partners and L Catterton Partners jointly purchased Cheddar's.

In August 2007, the company recruited Kelly Baltes from Darden Restaurants to serve as CEO.

In October 2014, Ian Baines was brought on as President and CEO of Cheddar's Scratch Kitchen, after serving as CEO and President at Uno Restaurant Holdings Corporation. Throughout his career, he has held various roles of increased responsibility with Darden Restaurants and Brinker International, Inc.

In 2015, the company changed its name to Cheddar's Scratch Kitchen.

In 2017, Cheddar's Scratch Kitchen acquired forty-four franchised units located in Ohio, Kentucky, Virginia, North Carolina, Tennessee and West Virginia from their "largest franchisee" Greer Companies, who is based in Kentucky. This brought their portfolio up to 164 corporate owned restaurants.

On March 27, 2017, Darden Restaurants announced its intent to acquire Cheddar's from shareholders such as L Catterton and Oak Investment Partners for $780 million plus another $10 million for transaction-related expenses. On March 28, 2017, when Darden announced it that had acquired Cheddar's Scratch Kitchen, Darden became the biggest gainer that day on the S&P 500. The acquisition was completed on April 24, 2017.

Menu
Cheddar's Scratch Kitchen serves a variety of made-from-scratch dishes. They are a dining establishment with traditional and modern American fare including hand-breaded Chicken Tenders, Homemade Chicken Pot Pie, and House Smoked Baby Back Ribs that are smoked for a minimum of four hours.

Awards and honors
In 2012, Zagat ranked Cheddar's the nation's No.1 full-service restaurant chain as well as Top Overall American Cuisine, the Top Rated Food and Top Rated Decor and Facilities.

Consumer Reports named Cheddar's #1 in the Pub Style or Grill Category in its two restaurant surveys in 2009 and 2012. The company also received the top ranking in value in Nation's Restaurant News/WD Partners' Consumer Picks Edition in 2011, 2012, and in 2013 for value, likelihood to return and likelihood to tell others.

In 2016, Technomic Consumer Choice Awards ranked Cheddar's No. 1 full-service restaurant chain for customer's intent to return.

In July 2016, Cheddar's was named #3 out of the "20 Top Full-Service Chains In Sales And Satisfaction" by Restaurant Business. Of all the full-service restaurants tracked, Cheddar's Scratch Kitchen earned the best value ratings from consumers. Its satisfaction score was also among the highest of the group.

Also in 2016, Cheddar's Scratch Kitchen named "Favorite Casual Dining Restaurant" in Market Force Study.

See also

List of restaurant chains
List of food companies
List of casual dining restaurant chains

References

External links
Cheddar's — official site

Companies based in Irving, Texas
Restaurants in Texas
Economy of the Midwestern United States
Economy of the Southeastern United States
Economy of the Southwestern United States
Regional restaurant chains in the United States
Restaurants established in 1979
Restaurant franchises
1979 establishments in Texas
2017 mergers and acquisitions
Darden Restaurants brands